Lois Gunden (February 25, 1915 – August 27, 2005) was the fourth of five Americans to be recognized as "Righteous Among the Nations" by Yad Vashem, the Shoah Martyrs' and Heroes' Remembrance Authority of Israel.  Gunden was born and raised in Goshen, Indiana.  In 1941, when she was 26 years old, she was teaching English for the Mennonite Central Committee in southern France when the Nazi occupation began.  She rescued several Jewish children and Spanish refugees from arrest.

In January 1943 she was detained by the Germans, only to be released in 1944 in a prisoner exchange. She returned home to Indiana and in 1958 she married a widower, Ernest Clemens. She never had any children of her own, but she gained a step-daughter through her marriage. Lois continued teaching French at Goshen College and Temple University, and in addition she ministered in the Mennonite Church.

On February 27, 2013, Yad Vashem recognized Lois Gunden as Righteous Among the Nations.

External links 
 
 

American Righteous Among the Nations
American Mennonites
Anabaptist–Jewish relations
People from Goshen, Indiana
American humanitarians
Women humanitarians
Goshen College faculty
Temple University faculty
1915 births
2005 deaths
20th-century American educators
21st-century American educators
20th-century American women
21st-century American women